The Centre at Salisbury is an  super regional mall  in Salisbury, Maryland. The mall is the only regional shopping mall in a  radius. The mall's anchor stores are Boscov's, Burlington, and Dick's Sporting Goods. It also features a 16 screen cinema stadium-style Regal Cinemas movie theater. The Centre at Salisbury is the largest shopping mall on the Eastern Shore of Maryland.

History
Construction began in April 1989 on The Centre of Salisbury, on a  parcel. The opening signaled the beginning of the end for the aging Salisbury Mall, which came about when it became obvious that an extension of the Salisbury bypass from U.S. Route 13 north over to U.S. Route 50 west was necessary to relieve the downtown congestion. It is no coincidence that The Centre at Salisbury is situated such as it is, at the juncture of two major highways—enjoying on the one hand, local business from U.S. Route 13, and beach traffic from the bypass on the other. The Centre was built at this location with that vision in mind. The Centre opened with anchors Hecht's, Boscov's, JCPenney, Sears, and Montgomery Ward.

The newly built Centre at Salisbury was able to attract more upscale establishments that were absent from the Salisbury Mall, including amenities that were standard at most regional shopping malls, like a food court and a modern 10 screen multi-plex theater (later 16 screens). Before, most shoppers would have to travel more than two hours away to the Baltimore/Washington, DC.,  Norfolk or Philadelphia metropolitan areas to shop upscale stores.

In December 1995, Macerich acquired the mall from developer Salisbury Springhill Ltd.  In December 2013, Macerich Salisbury LP sold the mall to Rouse Properties.

In 2000, Montgomery Ward announced it would be going out of business.  The space formerly occupied by Montgomery Ward was transformed into the new Regal Cinemas with additional outdoor retail space. The Hecht's store became Macy's in 2006 after Federated Department Stores purchased May Department Stores, the owner of Hecht's.

On January 15, 2014, it was announced that the JCPenney store would be closing as part of a plan to close 33 locations nationwide. JCPenney closed on May 3, 2014. On December 18, 2017, it was announced that Burlington Coat Factory would open a store in the former JCPenney space. Burlington Coat Factory opened on September 15, 2018. On December 28, 2018, Sears announced that it would be closing as part of a plan to close 80 stores nationwide. The store closed in March 2019. On January 6, 2020, it was announced that Macy's store would close as part of a plan to close 125 stores nationwide. The store closed in March 2020.

On March 17, 2021, Kohan Retail Investment Group acquired the mall from Rouse Properties.

Current stores
The Centre at Salisbury features 78 stores and eateries, including 3 anchor stores, food court, 16-screen movie theater, and children's softplay area. The mall features a Chuck E. Cheese's. Restaurants around the mall include Red Lobster, Olive Garden, Longhorn Steakhouse, and Greene Turtle. A Vernon Powell Shoes is also outside the mall.

The Centre at Salisbury is close to other major shopping centers, including The Commons (a  center), the Lord Salisbury Center, and many other stores, strip malls, and restaurants.

Current anchors
Boscov's (1990–Present)
Burlington (2018–Present)
Dick's Sporting Goods (2005–Present) 
HomeGoods (2016–Present)
H&M (2016–Present)
Regal Cinemas (2000–Present)

Former anchors
Hecht's (1990-2006)
JCPenney (1990-2014)
Macy's (2006-2020)
Montgomery Ward (1990-2000)
Pier 1 Imports (?-2020)
Sears (1990-2018)
Tuesday Morning (2017-2020)

Renovations and additions
The Centre at Salisbury was renovated in both 2005 and 2008. In 2010 the Food Court was remodeled, restrooms improved, WiFi added, and the establishment of a new Centre Court with Guest Services.

References

External links
The Centre at Salisbury official website

Kohan Retail Investment Group
Shopping malls in Maryland
Buildings and structures in Salisbury, Maryland
Shopping malls established in 1990
Tourist attractions in Wicomico County, Maryland
1990 establishments in Maryland